The McCrarys are an American family gospel and R&B group best known for the songs "You" (featuring Stevie Wonder on harmonica), "Lost in Loving You," "Love on a Summer Night" and "Any Ol' Sunday" (later covered by Chaka Khan). In 2014, they founded The McCrary Foundation, a nonprofit to help those in need through the healing powers of music.

History
Originally from Youngstown, Ohio, the family recording act consisted of siblings Linda, Alfred, Charity, Sam and Howard McCrary. In 1972, the quintet released a gospel album, Sunshine Day on Light Records. When the group moved from gospel to secular music in the mid-1970s, Howard left the group to continue in gospel. The group released their first album "Emerge" on Cat's Eye records in 1973, featuring the title song along with Kung Fu, Be A Father To Your Son, 6 other McCrary tunes and You've Got A Friend.

The group relocated to Los Angeles and recorded a series of R&B albums in the late 1970s and early 1980s.  Their biggest hit was "You" (written by Alfred, Linda and Sam McCrary), which featured harmonica by Stevie Wonder.  A huge R&B single, the song also achieved significant airplay on Pop radio stations, peaking just below the Top 40. It was featured on their debut Portrait album, Loving is Living.  On the album's cover notes, Stevie Wonder said about the group:

Their follow-up album on Portrait was the 1979 release, On the Other Side.  It featured the Top 40 R&B single, "Lost in Loving You." The song was written by Alfred McCrary, Linda McCrary and Sundray Tucker.

Howard rejoined the group for their first Capitol release, Just for You.  While the 1980 album was not as successful as their previous releases, the song "Any Ol' Sunday" (written by Linda and Alfred McCrary) became a hit single for Chaka Khan on her 1981 What Cha' Gonna Do for Me album.

Howard McCrary did not appear on All Night Music, their next Capitol release.  This album featured the single, "Love on a Summer Night."

In 2014, The McCrary's founded The McCrary Foundation Choir. Their first single "Let There Be Peace" was released on October 11, 2016.

Influence
"They sang a fresh, hip, urban style of gospel that was years before its time," said Andrew Hamilton in his biography of the group in the All Music Guide.  "They were doing in the early '70s what only became popular decades later."

The group continues to be revered among fans of the Northern Soul movement and is featured on the popular British website, Soulwalking.

Collaborative efforts
The McCrarys appeared as a group on Back to Earth, the 1978 album by Cat Stevens. The members have also appeared individually for an array of artists. For example:

Linda McCrary has worked on sessions with Michael Jackson, Stevie Wonder, Andrae Crouch, Sandra Crouch, Phil Driscoll, Keith Green, Candi Staton, Larnelle Harris, Kristle Murden, Philip Bailey, Danniebelle Hall, Becky Fender, Tommy Coomes, Bob Bailey (singer), Ron Kenoly, Scott V. Smith, Emerson, Lake & Palmer, Juice Newton and Angela Bofill.

Alfred McCrary has also worked with Andrae Crouch and on sessions with Larnelle Harris.  He's also performed with Michael McDonald, Yolanda Adams, Gloria Loring, Michael Card and Frankie Valli & the Four Seasons. Including his work with Sundray Tucker, he's also the most prolific songwriter of the family.

Charity McCrary has collaborated with Stevie Wonder, Michael Jackson, Andrae Crouch, Sandra Crouch, Larnelle Harris, Gavin Christopher, Chaka Khan, Cat Stevens, Ozzy Osbourne, Michael McDonald, Patrick Henderson, Marlo Henderson, Wayne Henderson, Trevor Lawrence, Philip Bailey, Keith Green, Danniebelle Hall, Kristle Murden, Bob Bailey (singer), Sara Hickman, Lee Garrett, BeBe & CeCe Winans and Melissa Manchester.

Howard McCrary has worked on projects with Quincy Jones, Andrae Crouch, Maria Muldaur, Helen Baylor, Edwin Hawkins, Keith Green, Kristle Murden, Larnelle Harris, Danniebelle Hall, Scott V. Smith, Becky Fender, Bob Bailey (singer), Jennifer Love Hewitt, Chaka Khan, Hanne Boel, the California Raisins, and Changing Faces. He also released the 1985 gospel album, So Good, for the A&M-distributed Good News label.

Sam McCrary has also recorded with Andrae Crouch, Michael Jackson, Larnelle Harris, and Candi Staton.

Discography

Albums

References

External links
The McCrarys single, "You" on YouTube
The McCrary Foundation
The McCrarys performance at Michael Jackson's televised funeral.
 
 

American gospel musical groups
American soul musical groups
Capitol Records artists
Family musical groups
Musicians from Ohio
Musical groups established in 1972